Jalaliyeh-ye Hajeri (also romanized as Jalālīyeh-ye Hajerī; also known as Jalālīyeh) is a village in Hoseynabad Rural District, in the Central District of Anar County, Kerman Province, Iran. At the 2006 census, its population was 77, in 18 families.

References 

Populated places in Anar County